Lis Wiehl (born August 19, 1961) is a New York Times bestselling American author of fiction and nonfiction books, and a legal analyst. She is the author of twenty books, including, most recently, A Spy in Plain Sight: The Inside Story of the FBI and Robert Hanssen―America's Most Damaging Russian Spy, published by Pegasus Books.

After working at NBC News and National Public Radio's All Things Considered, Wiehl moved to the Fox News Channel (FNC) where she served as a legal analyst and reporter for over fifteen years, appearing on numerous FNC shows. She is a regular commentator for CNN and also appears often on CBS, NPR and other news outlets.

Wiehl earned her Juris Doctor from Harvard Law School, her Master of Arts in Literature from the University of Queensland, and a bachelor's degree from Barnard College, Columbia University.

Early life and education 
Wiehl was born in Yakima, Washington, and graduated from West Valley High School in Yakima. She received a bachelor's degree from Barnard College, Columbia University in 1983, a Master of Arts in Literature from the University of Queensland in 1985, and a Juris Doctor from Harvard Law School in 1987.

Career 
After graduating from Harvard Law School, Wiehl practiced law at Perkins Coie, a private law firm in Seattle where she also wrote by-lined articles on legal issues for the New York Times. From there she went on to become a third generation federal prosecutor (her grandfather and her father — an FBI agent — were also federal prosecutors) in the US Attorney's Office in Seattle. She served as the Deputy Chief Investigative Counsel for Democrats on the House Judiciary Committee during President Clinton's impeachment.  From 1995 to 2001, she was a tenured law professor at the University of Washington School of Law in Seattle, where she ran the Trial Advocacy Program, which won several national awards during her tenure.

During her time at the University of Washington, Wiehl also stepped deeper into journalism by working as a reporter and legal analyst for NPR's All Things Considered and NBC News.  She soon came to be in high demand for her commentary.

From 2001 to 2017, Wiehl was a legal analyst for The Fox News Channel; she appeared weekly on The O'Reilly Factor, Your World with Neil Cavuto, The Kelly File with Megyn Kelly, Lou Dobbs Tonight, and the Imus morning shows. Wiehl also hosted the Legal Lis radio show and the Wiehl of Justice podcast.

In 2005, Wiehl released her first book, Winning Every Time: How to Use the Skills of a Lawyer in the Trials of Your Life.  Two years later she released The 51% Minority: How Women Still Are Not Equal and What You Can Do About It which was awarded the 2008 award for Books for a Better Life in the motivational category.  Since then, Wiehl has continued to write best-selling books of fiction and non-fiction including, in 2022, A Spy in Plain Sight: The Inside Story of the FBI and Robert Hanssen―America's Most Damaging Russian Spy.

Wiehl was the co-host of WOR Tonight With Joe Concha & Lis Wiehl on 710 WOR and she was also an adjunct professor of law at New York Law School.  She continues to appear in the media as a legal expert and commentator for organizations including CNN, CBS, NBC, and NPR among others.  Lis Wiehl lectures at colleges and universities, appears as a keynote speaker, and speaks at bookstores, conferences, and literary festivals.

Bill O'Reilly settlement 
Wiehl made sexual harassment allegations against Bill O'Reilly in early 2017 and received a $32 million settlement from him. Fox News was not a party to this settlement and regarded it as a personal issue between O'Reilly and Wiehl. They claim they were not informed of the amount of money involved. Wiehl signed an affidavit on January 17, 2017, stating that she and O'Reilly had settled their dispute. Her allegations and affidavit referred to repeated sexual harassment, a nonconsensual sexual relationship, and sexually explicit e-mails that O'Reilly had sent to her. O'Reilly claims that he forwarded these e-mails to Wiehl, who was working as his personal lawyer, as part of a process where he would forward any threatening e-mails he received to his lawyers.

Books

Stand-alone Non-fiction 
 A Spy in Plain Sight, Pegasus Books (May 3, 2022)

The Hunting Series (Non-fiction Series)
 Hunting The Unabomber, Nashville: Thomas Nelson Publishers-Fiction (April 28, 2020) 
 Hunting Charles Manson, HarperCollins (June 5, 2018)

Erica Sparks Series
 The Separatists, Nashville: Thomas Nelson Publishers-Fiction (June 27, 2017) 
 The Candidate, Nashville: Thomas Nelson Publishers-Fiction (October 4, 2016) 
 The Newsmakers, Nashville: Thomas Nelson Publishers-Fiction (January 19, 2016)

Stand-alone fiction
 Snapshot, Nashville: Thomas Nelson Publishers-Fiction (January 14, 2014)

Triple Threat Series
 Face of Betrayal, Nashville: Thomas Nelson Publishers-Fiction (April 7, 2009) 
 Hand of Fate, Nashville: Thomas Nelson Publishers-Fiction (April 6, 2010) 
 Heart of Ice, Nashville: Thomas Nelson Publishers-Fiction (April 5, 2011) 
 Eyes of Justice, Nashville: Thomas Nelson Publishers-Fiction (April 3, 2012)

The East Salem Trilogy
 Waking Hours, Nashville: Thomas Nelson Publishers-Fiction (October 4, 2011) 
 Darkness Rising, Nashville: Thomas Nelson Publishers-Fiction (October 2, 2012) 
 Fatal Tide, Nashville: Thomas Nelson Publishers-Fiction (September 17, 2013)

Mia Quinn Mysteries
 A Matter of Trust, Nashville: Thomas Nelson Publishers-Fiction (March 19, 2013) 
 A Deadly Business, Nashville: Thomas Nelson Publishers-Fiction (June 10, 2014) 
 Lethal Beauty, Nashville: Thomas Nelson Publishers-Fiction (March 3, 2015)

Nonfiction
 Winning Every Time: How to Use the Skills of a Lawyer in the Trials of Your Life, New York: Ballantine Books (April 26, 2005) 
 The 51% Minority: How Women Still Are Not Equal and What You Can Do About It, New York: Ballantine Books (February 27, 2007) 
 The Truth Advantage: The 7 Keys to a Happy and Fulfilling Life, Wiley (November 29, 2011)

References

External links 

 Official Website for Lis Wiehl
 Hunting Charles Manson (publisher's site)
 Lis Wiehl on Law & Crime
 Lis Wiehl's podcast Pursuit of Justice 
 New York Law School
 Fox News Website

1961 births
American women lawyers
Barnard College alumni
Fox News people
Harvard Law School alumni
Living people
Writers from Seattle
University of Queensland alumni
University of Washington School of Law faculty
New York Law School faculty
American women legal scholars
People associated with Perkins Coie
American women academics
21st-century American women